VFA-22, Strike Fighter Squadron 22, also known as the "Fighting Redcocks", are a United States Navy F/A-18F Super Hornet fighter squadron stationed at Naval Air Station Lemoore, California. Their tail code is NA and their radio callsign alternates between "Beef" and "Beef Eater".

History

Strike Fighter Squadron 22 was originally established as Fighter Squadron 63 (VF-63) at Naval Air Station Norfolk, Virginia on 28 July 1948, the squadron was re-designated as Attack Squadron 63 (VA-63) in March 1956, redesignated as Attack Squadron 22 (VA-22) on 1 July 1959 and redesignated Strike Fighter Squadron 22 (VFA-22) on 4 May 1990.

The squadron originally flew the F8F Bearcat, then the F4U Corsair, F9F Panther, F9 Cougar, FJ-4 Fury, A-4 Skyhawk, A-7 Corsair II, and the F/A-18C Hornet. Today, the 220 enlisted men and women and 40 officers of VFA-22 are based at NAS Lemoore, California, and have completed the transition from the single seat F/A-18E Super Hornet to the twin-seat F/A-18F Super Hornet.

Over the years, the squadron completed three combat deployments during the Korean War and six combat deployments during the Vietnam War, where it participated in Operation Pocket Money.

1980s

In the late 1970s and early 1980s, VA-22 embarked with Carrier Air Wing 15 aboard  and deployed to the Western Pacific and Indian Ocean. The Squadron won back to back Battle E awards during the 80 & 81 competitive cycles and was the co-west coast launch squadron for FLIR mounted A7Es.  While deployed aboard  in April 1988, while in the Persian Gulf, VA-22 aircraft participated in sinking the Iranian frigate Sahand which fired missiles at two American A-6 Intruders.

1990s
In 1993, the squadron deployed aboard  to the Persian Gulf and participated in Operation Southern Watch, enforcing the United Nations Southern no-fly zone over Iraq. Before returning home from deployment, the squadron diverted to the coast of Somalia and provided air support during Operation Continue Hope.

In December 1998, VFA-22 led the only Carrier Air Wing 11 of the Carl Vinson air strike of Operation Desert Fox.

2000s

In October 2001, VFA-22 operating from  performed strikes against Taliban and Al Qaeda forces in Afghanistan in support of Operation Enduring Freedom. In 2003, VFA-22 deployed with Carrier Air Wing 9 on board Carl Vinson on an extended eight month Western Pacific deployment in support of the Global War on Terrorism.  In July 2004, VFA-22 transitioned to F/A-18E Super Hornets, and in January, 2006, deployed with Carrier Air Wing 14 on board  for six months in support of the Global War on Terrorism.

In early 2007, VFA-22, made a surge deployment with Carrier Air Wing 14 and USS Ronald Reagan to the Pacific Ocean with a mixed unit of F/A-18E and F/A-18F as the unit was in the middle of transitioning aircraft again, this time from the single seat F/A-18E to the two seat F/A-18F. By the end of 2007, VFA-22 had transitioned to the F/A-18F Super Hornet, marking the first time in the squadron's history that it had operated twin-seat tactical aircraft and integrated Naval Flight Officers with the Naval Aviators in its officer complement.

On May 28, 2009, VFA-22 and Carrier Air Wing 14 deployed with USS Ronald Reagan on a deployment to the 7th and 5th Fleet Areas of Responsibility.

2010s

In 2010, The squadron re-located from Carrier Air Wing Fourteen to Carrier Air Wing Seventeen sporting the CVW-17 "AA" tailcode, and are now attached to USS NIMITZ.

See also
History of the United States Navy
List of inactive United States Navy aircraft squadrons
List of United States Navy aircraft squadrons

References

External links

 VFA-22's Official Webpage

Strike fighter squadrons of the United States Navy